Alexei Dmitrievich Kruchinin (born June 9, 1991) is a Russian professional ice hockey Forward. He is currently playing with Torpedo Nizhny Novgorod of the Kontinental Hockey League (KHL).

Playing career
Kruchinin made his Kontinental Hockey League (KHL) debut playing with SKA Saint Petersburg during the 2011–12 KHL season.

During the 2014–15 season, Kruchinin was traded by Lokomotiv Yaroslavl, along with Yegor Martynov, to Traktor Chelyabinsk in exchange for the rights to Petri Kontiola on November 23, 2014.

After four years with Traktor Chelyabinsk, Kruchinin was traded after the 2017–18 season, to his original club, SKA Saint Petersburg in exchange for financial compensation on June 6, 2018.

Kruchinin played one season with SKA, before returning at the conclusion of the 2018–19 season, to Traktor Chelyabinsk on a one-year contract on 11 May 2019.

References

External links

1991 births
Living people
HC Dinamo Saint Petersburg players
HC Kunlun Red Star players
Lokomotiv Yaroslavl players
Russian ice hockey forwards
Salavat Yulaev Ufa players
Sportspeople from Penza
HC Sibir Novosibirsk players
SKA-Neva players
SKA Saint Petersburg players
Torpedo Nizhny Novgorod players
Traktor Chelyabinsk players
HC Yugra players